Zhang Yifan (born 22 November 2000) is a Chinese swimmer. She competed in the women's 4 × 200 metre freestyle relay at the 2020 Summer Olympics.

References

External links
 

2000 births
Living people
Chinese female freestyle swimmers
Olympic swimmers of China
Swimmers at the 2020 Summer Olympics
Place of birth missing (living people)
Medalists at the 2020 Summer Olympics
Olympic gold medalists in swimming
Olympic gold medalists for China